Jesper Gunnar Fernando Nyholm (born September 10, 1993) is a professional footballer who plays as a center back for Thai League 1 club  Muangthong United and the Philippines national team. Born in Sweden, he represents the Philippines internationally.

International career
Born in Sweden, Nyholm is of Filipino descent through his mother. In early March 2017, he was contacted by the Philippine Football Federation regarding playing for the Philippines national team.  A month later, Nyholm revealed that upon speaking with his club coach Rikard Norling, he was told that he had great potential and should wait for the possibility to play for the Swedish national team.

He was called up to the Philippines in May 2021. He scored on his debut against Timor-Leste in a 7–0 win.

Career statistics

Club

International
International goals

References

External links 
 

1993 births
Living people
Citizens of the Philippines through descent
Filipino footballers
Philippines international footballers
Filipino people of Swedish descent
Footballers from Uppsala
Swedish footballers
Swedish people of Filipino descent
Association football defenders
IK Sirius Fotboll players
Dalkurd FF players
AIK Fotboll players
Superettan players
Allsvenskan players